Tim Bennetts (born 1 August 1990) is an Australian-born Japanese international rugby union player who plays as a centre.   He currently plays for the Canon Eagles in Japan's domestic Top League.

Early / provincial career

Bennetts was born and raised in Sydney, where he attended Pennant Hills High School.   He started playing Top League rugby in Japan with the Canon Eagles in 2012 and has been a regular starter for them over the past 4 seasons.

International

Bennetts made his international debut for his adopted country, Japan, in a world cup warm-up match against  in San Jose, California on 18 July 2015.   He did not make the squad for the tournament, but became more of a regular the following year, starting all 3 matches during the 2016 mid-year rugby union internationals series.

References

1990 births
Living people
Australian rugby union players
Japan international rugby union players
Rugby union centres
Yokohama Canon Eagles players
Rugby union players from Sydney
Australian emigrants to Japan
Munakata Sanix Blues players
Green Rockets Tokatsu players